The ARM Cortex-A76 is a central processing unit implementing the ARMv8.2-A 64-bit instruction set designed by ARM Holdings' Austin design centre. ARM states a 25% and 35% increase in integer and floating point performance, respectively, over a Cortex-A75 of the previous generation.

Design
The Cortex-A76 serves as the successor of the ARM Cortex-A73 and ARM Cortex-A75, though based on a clean sheet design. 

The Cortex-A76 frontend is a 4-wide decode out-of-order superscalar design. It can fetch 4 instructions per cycle. And rename and dispatch 4 Mops, and 8 µops per cycle. The out-of-order window size is 128 entries. The backend is 8 execution ports with a pipeline depth of 13 stages and the execution latencies of 11 stages.

The core supports unprivileged 32-bit applications, but privileged applications must utilize the 64-bit ARMv8-A ISA. It also supports Load acquire (LDAPR) instructions (ARMv8.3-A), Dot Product instructions (ARMv8.4-A), PSTATE Speculative Store Bypass Safe (SSBS) bit and the speculation barriers (CSDB, SSBB, PSSBB) instructions (ARMv8.5-A).

Memory bandwidth increased 90% relative to the A75. According to ARM, the A76 is expected to offer twice the performance of an A73 and is targeted beyond mobile workloads. The performance is targeted at "laptop class", including Windows 10 devices, competitive with Intel's Kaby Lake.

The Cortex-A76 support ARM's DynamIQ technology, expected to be used as high-performance cores when used in combination with Cortex-A55 power-efficient cores.

Licensing
The Cortex-A76 is available as SIP core to licensees, and its design makes it suitable for integration with other SIP cores (e.g. GPU, display controller, DSP, image processor, etc.) into one die constituting a system on a chip (SoC).

Usage 
The Cortex-A76 was first used in the HiSilicon Kirin 980.

ARM has also collaborated with Qualcomm for a semi-custom version of the Cortex-A76, used within their high-end Kryo 495 (Snapdragon 8cx)/Kryo 485 (Snapdragon 855 and 855 Plus), and also in their mid-range Kryo 460 (Snapdragon 675) and Kryo 470 (Snapdragon 730) CPUs. One of the modifications Qualcomm made was increasing reorder buffer to increase the out-of-order window size.

It is also used in the Exynos 990 and Exynos Auto V9. And the MediaTek Helio G90/G90T/G95 and Dimensity 800 and Dimensity 820. And the HiSilicon Kirin 985 5G and Kirin 990 4G/990 5G/990E 5G.

The Cortex-A76 can be found in Snapdragon 855 as Big-core.

The Cortex-A76 is used as Big-core in Intel Agilex D-series SoC FPGA devices.

In 2020 Cortex-A76 was used in Rockchip RK3588 and RK3588s.

See also 

 ARM Cortex-A75, predecessor
 ARM Cortex-A77, successor
 Comparison of ARMv8-A cores, ARMv8 family

References

ARM processors